The Swedish Magic Circle Society (SMC) is the national organization for magic in Sweden. SMC was founded in 1946, has its seat in Stockholm, and counts around 350 members. The magazine of SMC is called Trollkarlen ("The Magician"). In 2011 was the 65-year anniversary.

See also 
 Tom Stone (magician)

References

External links 
 Official webpage

Magic organizations
Clubs and societies in Sweden
Organizations established in 1946